Angela Gweneth Woollacott (born 1955) is an Australian historian who has contributed to the history of the British Empire and Australia. She has written many books and journal articles, as well as a series of Australian history textbooks, served on the editorial boards for Journal of Women's History, Journal of British Studies, and Lilith: A Feminist History Journal, and served on the international advisory board for Settler Colonial Studies. She is a past president of the Australian Historical Association.

A review said of one of Woollacott's books, "Woollacott has written a stimulating and thought-provoking study of the nature and dynamics of settler colonialism in the southern colonies. It sets an agenda for new research and will prompt historians to re-examine many of their assumptions about colonial society in Australia."

Bibliography

Books

References

External links

1955 births
Living people
20th-century Australian historians
20th-century Australian women writers
21st-century Australian historians
21st-century Australian women writers
Australian women historians
British women historians
Fellows of the Academy of the Social Sciences in Australia
Fellows of the Australian Academy of the Humanities
Fellows of the Royal Historical Society
Historians of the British Empire
People from Adelaide
Australian women academics